Zoltan Torey (Pron: Zoltán Tor-ee) who was born in Hungary on 21 November 1929 and died in 2014  is a Hungarian-Australian Psychologist, Writer and a Philosopher.  He is known for his theories on consciousness. He left Hungary when he was 18 years old and came to Australia in 1949. Later he became blind in an industrial accident and forced to leave his studies to become a dentist. Next phase of his life started after earning a degree in Clinical Psychology. He not only worked as a practitioner in Clinical Psychology but also wrote three books;  one of them more autobiographical and the others on what is known as hard problem in philosophy.

Early life

Zoltan was the only child of Zoltan Torey and Jolan Szabo, an upper middle-class family from Budapest. and had grown up in a privileged environment among intellectuals. The Russian Army came to Budapest around December 1944 and in the following year, Hungary came under the Soviet occupation. Zoltan, the senior was arrested under the guise of him being a liberal subversive and a bleak life befell the family. After his matriculation in 1948, in the face of not getting a university place for hailing from a bourgeois background, he left Hungary with three other youth by crossing Austro-Hungarian border. The 19-year old Zoltan landed in Melbourne, Australia on 17 July 1949.

Life in Australia

After arriving in Australia, he was admitted to a degree course in dentistry at University of Sydney in the following year and also started to work part time at several jobs. In 1951, while he was loosening the plug in a vat of acid at the plant he was working, he was sprayed in an accident, with battery acid causing blindness, damage to his throat and fusion of vocal codes. This accident also made his voice a whisper. While still in the hospital he married his first wife and later left for France in the hope of getting a corneal graft done. After dashing the hope for vision, he came back to Australia with his wife and both graduated with Bachelor of Arts degrees in psychology and philosophy at the turn of 1960s.

After his accident, contrary to the advice he received to use his auditory faculties, he trained himself to visualise his surrounds. He became so adept at visual imagery he could replace roof-guttering of his multi-gabled house single-handedly, even at night, to the horror of his neighbours.

He published his second book Out of Darkness  in 2003 on the suggestion from the British neurologist Oliver Sacks to document how the blindness changed his life and how he dealt with it. When he died, he had completed final checks on the manuscript of his last book The Conscious Mind, a book for the non-specialist on the mind-body problem, that was published by MIT Press in 2014

References

1929 births
2014 deaths
Australian people of Hungarian descent
Naturalised citizens of Australia
Philosophers of mind